Willie Christopher Carter III (born September 18, 1981) is an American politician who served as a member of the Missouri House of Representatives for the 76th district from 2019 to 2021.

References

Carter, Chris
Living people
21st-century American politicians
1981 births